A private members' bill (PMB) in the Parliament of the United Kingdom is a type of public bill that can be introduced by either members of the House of Commons or House of Lords who are not Ministers. Less parliamentary time is given to such bills and as a result only a minority of PMBs actually become law. Such bills can be used however to create publicity for a cause or issue and can affect legislation indirectly.

Methods
There are three methods by which a Member of Parliament can introduce a Private Members' Bill: by ballot, by the Ten Minute Rule, and by presentation.

Ballot
Under this method Members who apply are drawn from a ballot and, if successful, are given Parliamentary time for their bill. Members of Parliament who are successful in the ballot often have a higher chance of seeing their legislation passed, as greater Parliamentary time is given to ballots than other methods of passing a PMB such as under the Ten Minute Rule. It is normal for the first seven ballot bills to get one day's debate each.

Ten Minute Rule

The Ten Minute Rule is a method of introducing a PMB after a brief debate. A member speaks for up to ten minutes on a motion under Standing Order 23 to introduce a bill, followed potentially by an opposing member's ten minute speech. If the motion is passed, the bill is introduced and given a formal first reading; it is unlikely to make further progress because it will not be given priority on the parliamentary calendar. The Ten Minute Rule can be used to generate publicity for a particular issue. Often they are used merely as an opportunity to criticise legislation rather than pass a bill.

Presentation
Under this method any Member of Parliament may introduce a PMB if they have previously given an indication that they intend to do so. Members then formally introduce the bill but do not speak to support it. It is rare for a PMB to succeed by this method.

Procedure
The second reading  and subsequent readings of Private Members Bills take place on a sitting Friday. The sitting times for debate are 9.30am until 2.30pm, the debates for each bill must be concluded before 2.30pm in order to progress to the next stage of the bill passage. If the debate has not concluded before the time has run out, it will be moved to the bottom of the list of bills to be read and rescheduled for another time. For any sitting Friday there can be as many as 50 bills scheduled for debate on the order paper, however due to the short amount of time allotted to Friday sittings, Parliament has never progressed further than the 4th bill listed on the order of business for the day.

Criticisms

The current system of Private Members' Bills has been criticised for being easily susceptible to filibustering. Labour MP Kerry McCarthy has compared the system to the BBC radio game show Just a Minute but in reverse stating that the more hesitation, deviation and repetition an MP makes the more likely they are to defeat a bill. As Private Members' Bills are debated on Fridays attendance in debates is often poor as Members of Parliament return to their constituency.

Reform proposals
The low number of Private Members' Bill passed has resulted in calls for reform of the PMB system. The Hansard Society has produced reform proposals in a pamphlet called 'Enhancing the Role of Backbench MPs'. The pamphlet calls for greater resourcing of PMBs and changes to the times when Private Members' Bills are debated.

Recent successful PMBs

1980s

1990s

2000s

2010s

Current parliamentary session

References

External links
Parliament

Parliament of the United Kingdom